Jesús Herrero Parrón  (born 4 November 1986), commonly known as Jesús Herrero, is a Spanish futsal player who plays for Inter Movistar as a Goalkeeper.

References

External links
LNFS profile
UEFA profile

1986 births
Living people
Futsal goalkeepers
Sportspeople from Madrid
Spanish men's futsal players
Caja Segovia FS players
Inter FS players